"Part Time Punks" is a song by the English post-punk group Television Personalities. Written in 1978 by band leader and vocalist Dan Treacy, it was released as a single in 1980 on Rough Trade Records. The record features Treacy, fellow teenager and school friend Ed Ball, and drummer Mark Sheppard.

"Part Time Punks"  was first released as part of their 1978 four song EP "Where's Bill Grundy Now?". Treacy self-financed the EP, in part with a loan from his parents. He had intended to release the song as a single immediately after, but was unable to afford to press the 7-inch singles. When a copy of the track was picked up by the BBC DJ John Peel, Treacy was offered a number of record deals before eventually signing with Rough Trade. Their 1980 release of the single brought the Television Personalities to prominence within the then emerging independent music scene, selling an estimated 27,000 copies in its first year.  

The lyrics are a humour-infused satire of the late-comer, fashion-oriented, plastic punks who emerged c 1979 after the English punk rock movement emerged from the underground and went mainstream, especially after Bill Grundy's infamous live TV interview with the Sex Pistols on the 'Today' programme in 1976, during which the band swore and after which the TV host was fired from the ITV network.

Recording and distribution
Treacy was inspired to form the Television Personalities after hearing the Sex Pistols and Jonathan Richman. Ever unconventional, he said he was not that much interested in music and the band rarely rehearsed. Treacy was averse to preparing set-lists for live performances, preferring to keep the band on their toes. Head remembers "us rehearsing once in late 1983. We did another one five years later, and that was about it." The band struggled to find a name, and early suggestions included the names of mainstream and often ridiculed television hosts such as Nicholas Parsons, Russell Harty, Bruce Forsyth and Hughie Green, before they decided on the more generic "Television Personalities".

While still a teenager, and with financial assistance from his parents, paid out of pocket for the 1978 recording of the Television Personalities debut EP "Where's Bill Grundy Now?". He intended to release "Part Time Punks" as a single, but having after the recording and mastering, realised during the test pressing that he would be unable to afford to generate enough copies of the single qualify for a release. The initial pressings left him with just two copies, one of which he sent to the influential BBC radio DJ John Peel, who played it repeatedly. On the strength of the song, he offered the band a Peel Session, which they recorded at BBC Radio 1 on 20 August 1980, but wanting to display their newer songs, omitted "Part Time Punks". Peel, who was very orientated towards singles throughout his career, was disappointed when he heard that the song had been omitted but, noting the band's youth, remarked in good humour: "Oh, it's such a shame that children have to grow up".

As a result of this exposure, Tracey was contacted by a number of independent record labels offering to press and distribute the track. During this period he and Ball formed the Whaam! label, and released a number of further self-financed singles. This project was however renamed "Dreamworld", after a cease and desist letter from legal representatives of George Michael, who paid an undisclosed sum to get the duo to choose a title unsimilar to Wham!.  Treacy eventually signed with Geoff Travis' Rough Trade Records, who released the single in 1980. It became instantly popular, with the first 14,000 copies selling in 6 months, and a further 13,000 pressed six months later. The song brought the band to attention abroad, and lead to tours and record sales in America, Germany and Holland.

Lyrics and style

The recorded version of the song is performed in Television Personalities' characteristic  low-fi and deliberately shambolic style. Tracey sings in vernacular language, with a pronounced London accent and a story-telling intonation. Adding to the deliberately amateurish tone, both Treacy and Ball seem to struggle to keep their vocal harmonies in-tune. 

The lyrics take a critical and ironic look at aspects of the evolution of punk rock from its underground beginnings in the mid-1970s, into a more commercialised, fashionable and mainstream style. According to the music journalist Rob Young, the song reflects the "transference of the earnest imperatives behind punk rock into a pastiche", and satires "the cartoon-mohican punk rockers that had taken over the King's Road as helpless fashion victims  ignorant of the founding spirit of punk rock."  Author and journalist  Lina Lecaro described the song as about poseurs and late adopters "who pound the pit or rock the look only on the weekend". Treacy re-explored the theme in 1995's -far darker- "I Was a Mod Before You Was a Mod".

Although the song mentions several contemporary people, bands and record labels, including John Peel, Siouxsie and the Banshees and Rough Trade Records, it wasn't intended to criticise them directly, more to, in the words of critic Ian Birch, highlight "the kind of unthinking acceptance that people can adopt towards figureheads."<ref>Birch, Ian. "Rough Trade Records: The Humane Sell". Melody Maker, 10 February 1979</ref> Asked in a 1980 interview with Sounds magazine, if he was once a part time punk, Tracey said: "Oh Christ yeah, I'm the worst of the lot. Up to about six months ago I was just like everybody else. If there was a review in Sounds saying this is a good album I'd go and but it...The other night I was looking over the road, not with me telescope, and there was actually someone pogoing in their bedroom. That's when I realised everybody takes it too seriously."

Influence and reception
The song has been widely influential, with elements of its style adopted by bands such as Belle and Sebastian and Arctic Monkeys. Part Time Punks appears on the 1995 Television Personalities early singles and B-sides compilation "Yes Darling, But Is It Art". The 1999 'Best of' album "Part Time Punks: The Very Best Of Television Personalities" was titled after the song.

Kelefa Sanneh said of the song, "Dan Treacy led what sounded like a bedroom sing-along, poking fun of young people practising their punk moves at home. The verses were rather judgmental, but by the time he got to the chorus, Treacy sounded more like a small boy watching a delightful parade."

Notes

References
Citations

Sources

 Cavanagh, David. The Creation Records Story: My Magpie Eyes Are Hungry for the Prize. London: Virgin Books, 2000. 
 Robb, John. Punk Rock: An Oral History. London: Ebury Press, 2006. 
 Weisbard, Eric. Spin Alternative Record Guide. New York: Vintage Books, 1996. 
 Young, Rob. Rough Trade: Labels Unlimited''. London: Black Dog Publishing, 2006. 

1978 songs
1980 singles